Teresa Little (née Soulen) is an American educator who is the first lady of Idaho as the wife of governor Brad Little. During her husband's term as lieutenant governor of Idaho, Little served as the second lady.

Early life and education 
Little was born Teresa Soulen in Weiser, Idaho and raised on a ranch. She earned a Bachelor of Arts degree in home economics education with minors in science and physical education from the University of Idaho.

Career 
After graduating from college, Little taught high school in Oregon. After marrying Brad Little in 1978, she became a homemaker. During her husband's career in politics, Little has served on many non-profit boards, including Idaho Public Television. She has also acted as an informal political advisor to her husband.

References 

First Ladies and Gentlemen of Idaho
University of Idaho alumni
People from Weiser, Idaho
Living people
People from Washington County, Idaho
Year of birth missing (living people)